Mellitidae is a family of sand dollars, in the echinoderm order Clypeasteroida. These irregular sea urchins bury themselves in soft sediment in shallow seas.

Genera
The World Register of Marine Species includes the following genera in the family:-

Encope L. Agassiz, 1840
Lanthonia Coppard, 2016
Leodia Gray, 1851
Mellita L. Agassiz, 1841
Mellitella Duncan, 1889

References

 
Clypeasteroida
Echinoderm families